The 2015 Judo Grand Prix Tbilisi was held at the Olympic Palace in Tbilisi, Georgia from 20 to 22 March 2015.

Medal summary

Men's events

Women's events

Source Results

Medal table

References

External links
 

2015 IJF World Tour
2015 Judo Grand Prix
Judo
Grand Prix 2015
Judo